Corporal Kate is a  1926 silent film comedy romance directed by Paul Sloane and starring Vera Reynolds and Julia Faye. The film was produced by C. Gardner Sullivan, with production at De Mille Pictures Corp., and released by Producers Distributing Corporation.

Plot
In World War I, Brooklyn manicurists Kate Jones (Vera Reynolds) and Becky Finkelstein (Julia Faye), work up a song-and-dance act that they intend to take overseas to entertain the troops. Through the influence of a friend, the girls are assigned to the French front.

Both girls fall in love with Jackson Clark (Kenneth Thompson), a rich playboy, who is in the American Expeditionary Forces, along with Williams (Harry Allen), his valet. Evelyn (Majel Coleman), a friend of Jackson's, also goes to France as a Red Cross nurse

Jackson falls for Kate and is jealous of Evelyn, but, unknown to any of them, Evelyn loves an American aviator. When the Germans advance, Becky is killed, dying in Jackson's arms.

Kate loses her arm in a selfless and heroic action, and Jackson, still greatly in love with her, proposes that they spend the rest of their lives together.

Cast

 Vera Reynolds as Kate Jones
 Julia Faye as Becky Finkelstein
 Majel Coleman as Evelyn
 Kenneth Thompson as Jackson (*aka Kenneth Thomson)
 Harry Allen as Williams

Production
Although not directly an aviation film, Corporal Kate featured a number of stunt pilots, including Frank Clarke and Leo Nomis flying a Standard L 6 and Thomas-Morse aircraft.

Reception
Film reviewer Hal Erickson, in his review of Corporal Kate, noted, the girls "...encounter all manner of merry misadventures. Things get serious, however, when both Kate and Becky fall in love with the same doughboy, Private Jackson (Kenneth Thompson). This romantic triangle is rather bluntly resolved when tragedy strikes on the battlefield."

Preservation status
Corporal Kate is preserved in the Library of Congress collection and UCLA Film and Television Archive.

References

Notes

Citations

Bibliography

 Catalog of Holdings, The American Film Institute Collection and The United Artists Collection at The Library of Congress. Los Angeles, California: American Film Institute, 1978.  .
 Farmer, James H. Celluloid Wings: The Impact of Movies on Aviation (1st ed.). Blue Ridge Summit, Pennsylvania: TAB Books 1984. .

External links
  Corporal Kate at IMDb.com
 
 DVD Grapevine

1926 films
American silent feature films
American aviation films
1926 romantic comedy films
Producers Distributing Corporation films
American black-and-white films
American romantic comedy films
Films directed by Paul Sloane
1920s American films
Silent romantic comedy films
Silent American comedy films